Lee Taeg-yeong (born 26 June 1930) is a South Korean weightlifter. He competed in the men's lightweight event at the 1960 Summer Olympics.

References

1930 births
Living people
South Korean male weightlifters
Olympic weightlifters of South Korea
Weightlifters at the 1960 Summer Olympics
Sportspeople from Seoul
Asian Games medalists in weightlifting
Asian Games gold medalists for South Korea
Weightlifters at the 1958 Asian Games
Medalists at the 1958 Asian Games
20th-century South Korean people
21st-century South Korean people